Charles Simms may refer to:

 Charles Carroll Simms  (1824–1884), American Navy officer
 Charles Simms (gymnast) (1928-2003), American gymnast
 Charles Simms (lawyer) (1755–1819), American lawyer and politician
 Charlie Simms (1859–1935), English footballer

See also
 Charles Sims (disambiguation)